The 2012 Popular Democratic Party primaries were the primary elections by which voters of the Popular Democratic Party (PPD) chose its nominees for various political offices of Puerto Rico for the 2012 general elections. They were held on March 18, 2012 and coincided with the Republican Party primaries in the island.

Background

At the time of the primaries, the Popular Democratic Party had already chosen current Senator Alejandro García Padilla, as their gubernatorial candidate. He would be joined in the ballot by Rafael Cox Alomar as candidate for Resident Commissioner of Puerto Rico.

In the Senate, there were 5 sitting senators looking to retain their election spots. In the House, there were around 5 sitting representatives as well. Also, some returning candidates from previous years, like Roberto Vigoreaux, and other former officeholders, like Miguel Pereira and Aníbal José Torres, were entering the political race. Some relatives of known politicians also made the jump to politics. Eduardo Ferrer, brother of Héctor Ferrer, was aspiring for a Senate spot, while Javier Aponte Dalmau, brother of current mayor of Carolina, José Aponte Dalmau, both sons of former mayor José Aponte de la Torre, was running for a spot as representative for District 38.

Francisco Zayas Seijo, who was mayor of Ponce, was also attempting a return to politics after his defeat in 2008. He was running for the mayoral candidacy again, this time against Ramón Torres. The only sitting mayor from the PPD that was challenged in a primary was Edgardo Arlequín, from Guayanilla.

Also, the amount of primaries per municipality and districts were few, when compared to previous years. As a result, the primaries were expected to be of low participation among the party members.

Candidates

Mayors
The Popular Democratic Party held primaries in 20 of 78 municipalities.

Aibonito
 Leonardo González
 Lisandro Quiles
 Dennis Nuñez

Arecibo
 René González
 Gilberto Legarreta
 Jesús "Manía" López
 Raquel Ortíz Roldán

Arroyo
 Eric Bachier Román
 Roberto Cora

Camuy
 Ricardo García
 Víctor Román Vélez

Cidra
 Roberto Colón
 Georgie Maldonado
 Rudy Santos

Culebra
 Alexis Bermúdez
 Iván Solís

Fajardo
 Michael Avilés
 Reginald Neptune Torres

Guayama
 Eduardo Cintrón
 Samuel Ruíz

Guayanilla
 Edgardo Arlequín
 Juan "Tonito" Torres

Luquillo
 Jesús "Jerry" Marquéz
 María "Yini" Santiago

Moca
 Héctor "Mol" Ibañez
 Domingo "Isín" Méndez
 Samuel Pellot

Morovis
 Miguel "Mickey" Ríos
 Roxana "Ivy" Sánchez

Naguabo
 Wilfredo Astacio
 Aguedo Rivera Ríos
 José Obel Rosario

Patillas
 José "Cheo" Pabón
 Norberto Soto Figueroa

Ponce
 Ramón Torres Morales
 Francisco Zayas Seijo

San Sebastián
 Reinaldo Ramos
 Angel Salas Pérez

Santa Isabel
 Jaime Muñoz
 Justo Torres

Toa Alta
 Clemente Agosto
 José "Tito" Rolón

Utuado
 Ernesto Irizarry Salvá
 Rafael Juarbe Pagán

Vieques
 Víctor Emeric
 José Cedrid Morales
 Dámaso Serrano

Results

Senate

At-large

District

San Juan

Arecibo

Mayagüez-Aguadilla

Ponce

Guayama

Humacao

Carolina

House of Representatives

At-large

District

District 1

District 3

District 4

District 9

District 10

District 12

District 13

District 14

District 15

District 16

District 18

District 19

District 20

District 22

District 23

District 24

District 27

District 29

District 30

District 31

District 32

District 35

District 36

District 38

See also

New Progressive Party primaries, 2012

References

External links
Comisión Estatal de Elecciones
Comisionado Electoral PPD

Primary elections in Puerto Rico
2012 Puerto Rico elections
Popular Democratic Party (Puerto Rico)